Launder is a surname. Notable people with the surname include:

 Brian Launder (born 1939), English Professor of Mechanical Engineering
 Dimitri Launder, British artist
 Frank Launder (1906–1997), English film director, producer and writer
 Simon Launder (born 1978), Welsh cricketer

See also
 Launders (surname)